The 2020–21 Liga Gimel season is the 53rd season of fifth-tier football in Israel.

Format change
To accommodate the shortened schedule caused by COVID-19 pandemic, Divisions with more than 12 teams (Sharon, Tel Aviv, Central and South division) were divided into two sub-divisions. After completion of the league schedule the two top teams from each sub-division would qualify to a promotion group of four teams, with the winning team gaining promotion to Liga Bet and the second-placed team qualify to the promotion play-offs. The bottom clubs played another round of matches between themselves.

Upper Galilee (North A) Division

Lower Galilee (North B) Division

Jezreel (North C) Division

Samaria (North D) Division

Sharon (South A) Division

Sub-division A

Sub-division B

Promotion group

Tel Aviv (South B) Division

Sub-division A

Sub-division B

Promotion group

Central (South C) Division

Sub-division A

Sub-division B

Promotion group

South (South D) Division

Sub-division A

Sub-division B

Promotion group

Promotion play-offs
The promotion play-offs were played in two rounds. In the first the two runners-up from each pair of divisions (Upper Galilee and Lower Galilee, Jezreel and Samaria, Sharon and Tel Aviv and Central and South) played each other, with the winner advancing to meet the losing team of the Liga Bet relegation play-offs.

Promotion to Liga Bet North A Division

Promotion to Liga Bet South A Division

Promotion to Liga Bet North B Division

Promotion to Liga Bet South B Division

References

5
Liga Gimel seasons
Israel Liga Gimel